Fernwood Pioneer Cemetery, also known as Everest Cemetery and the G.A.R Cemetery, is an historic cemetery situated in an unincorporated area of Yamhill County near Newberg, Oregon, United States. The one-acre site was established in 1882; many of the first settlers to the Newberg area were buried at the cemetery from then until 1922. It is listed on the National Register of Historic Places.

See also
 National Register of Historic Places listings in Yamhill County, Oregon

References

External links
 
 

1882 establishments in Oregon
Cemeteries on the National Register of Historic Places in Oregon
National Register of Historic Places in Yamhill County, Oregon
Newberg, Oregon